Dušan Beslać (born October 6, 1998) is a Serbian professional basketball player for Vojvodina of the Basketball League of Serbia.

Playing career 
Beslać played basketball for youth systems of Vršac and Vizura Shark.

During the 2015–16 season, he played for Smederevo 1953. In 2016, he joined Dynamic BG.

International career 
Beslać was a member of the Serbian U-18 national team that participated at the 2016 FIBA Europe Under-18 Championship and a member of the Serbian U-16 national team that participated at the 2014 FIBA Europe Under-16 Championship.

Career statistics

Domestic leagues

|-
| 2015–16 || style="text-align:left;"| Smederevo 1953 || rowspan="7" style="text-align:center;"|KLS || 12 || 11.0 || .522 || .300 || .583 || 2.0 || .3 || .1 || .0 || 2.8
|-
| 2016–17 || rowspan="4" style="text-align:left;"| Dynamic BG || 19 || 5.6 || .484 || .357 || .714 || .5 || .3 || .2 || .1 || 2.1
|-
| 2017–18 || 36 || 13.1 || .449 || .411 || .775 || 2.1 || 1.0 || .4 || .6 || 5.3
|-
| 2018–19 || 22 || 18.0 || .433 || .367 || .892 || 3.0 || .4 || .6 || .6 || 8.3
|-
| 2019–20 || 25 || 21.0 || .504 || .380 || .731 || 3.0 || 1.5 || .5 || .8 || 8.2
|-
| 2020–21 || rowspan="2" style="text-align:left;"| Vojvodina || 30 || 26.8 || .550 || .323 || .750 || 5.2 || 1.2 || .6 || .8 || 13.4
|-
| 2021–22 || 24 || 30.1 || .475 || .344 || .815 || 7.9 || 1.9 || 1.1 || 1.5 || 16.6
|}

References

External links 
 Profile at aba-liga.com
 Player Profile at eurobasket.com
 Player Profile at realgm.com

1998 births
Living people
Basketball League of Serbia players
KK Dynamic players
KK Smederevo players
KK Vojvodina players
Serbian men's basketball players
Sportspeople from Sombor
Power forwards (basketball)